Natatolana lilliput is a species of crustacean in the family Cirolanidae, and was first described by Stephen John Keable in 2006. The species epithet, lilliput, is from the  Lilliput of Gulliver's Travels, and refers to the specie's short antennae.

It is a benthic species, living at depths of 3 - 25 m in temperate waters, and is found in waters of the Tasmanian Shelf Province.  It is a scavenger.

References

External links
Natatolana lilliput occurrence data from GBIF

Cymothoida
Crustaceans of Australia
Crustaceans described in 2006
Taxa named by Stephen John Keable